Johann Christoph Schwab (10 December 1743 - 15 April 1821) was a Württemberg philosopher.

Life
Johann Christoph Schwab was born in Ilsfeld, a small country town in the hills north of Stuttgart.   His father was an accountant employed in the public service.

Schwab attended the University of Tübingen where he studied Philosophy and Theology, obtaining his degree in 1764.   After this he spent eleven years working in the French speaking region to the north of Lake Geneva, taking a succession of tutoring posts.   By the end of these years he had acquired a deep knowledge of French literature and of the French language.  In 1778 he was appointed to a professorship for Logic and Metaphysics at the Hohe Karlsschule (academy) in Stuttgart.   Friedrich Schiller was a student there at the same time.

Schwab was not an admirer of the new Kantian  critical philosophical approach emanating from Königsberg.   His lectures tended to ignore Kant.   In numerous books and essays he refuted the significance of the new approach as a reformulation of old thought patterns:  he took every opportunity to characterise Kant's contribution as insignificant and shot through with inconsistency and contradiction.

The spread of Kant's ideas had an increasingly polarising impact, and as he grew older Schwab moved from a position of nuanced conservatism, becoming progressively more "spirited" in his advocacy of the "traditional" philosophical structures identified by Leibniz and Wolff.

Over the years Schwab received several prizes for his philosophical writings, including three from the Berlin based Prussian Academy of Sciences of which he became an external member in 1788 and an honorary member in 1812.   Perhaps the most significant of those prizes was the first, awarded in 1784, won ex-aequo with Antoine de Rivarol, in an essay investigating why French had become a universal international language across Europe, how long this situation might continue, and whether the distinction was merited.

It was shortly after receiving that first prize that he was summoned to Berlin by a committed user of the French language and admirer of French culture, King Frederick.   He was offered a post at the Military Academy in Berlin, which at this time was the principal government supported education establishment in Prussia.   In the event, however, Schwab received more persuasive offers of preferment at home.   The Prince of Württemberg gave him a government appointment as privy secretary in Stuttgart.    The duke died in 1793 and was succeeded by his brother, Duke Louis Eugene, who had known Schwab when they had been young men in the French speaking area north of Geneva.   Johann Christoph Schwab now received further promotion, becoming a privy councillor.   There was some opposition from those who questioned whether a background as an establishment philosopher was an appropriate basis for accelerated promotion to a senior position in government service, and in 1798 an anonymous letter appeared defending Schwab's position.   Controversy nevertheless rumbled on, although the impact of the French Revolutionary Wars was a more pressing concern for government during the 1790s.   Schwab continued to hold a succession of government appointments during these turbulent years, and in 1816 the new king, William I, appointed him an Oberstudienrat (senior counsellor).   Despite his government responsibilities, Schwab continued his work as a philosopher at least till 1813.   His final work, "On the dark precepts" ("Von den dunkeln Vorstellungen") continued to apply and refine the Leibniz method even though he was well aware that by now this left him isolated from what had become the intellectual mainstream. 

Johann Christoph Schwab died at Stuttgart on 15 April 1821.

Personal
Schwab married Johanna Philippina Friderika Rapp who came from a well established Stuttgart based merchant family.   She was a niece of the sculptor Johann Heinrich von Dannecker.   Children of the Schwab marriage included the Justice Minister and privy councillor  (1781-1847) and the writer-priest Gustav Schwab (1792-1850).

References

People from Heilbronn (district)

German philosophers
Academic staff of the University of Stuttgart
18th-century philosophers
19th-century philosophers
Geheimrat
Members of the Prussian Academy of Sciences

1743 births
1821 deaths